Pontia sisymbrii, the spring white, California white, or Colorado white, is a butterfly in the family Pieridae. It is found in mountainous areas of western Canada and the United States.

It is mostly white with small black markings; females may be yellowish. Similar to other checkered whites such as, Pontia beckerii, Pontia protodice, and Pontia occidentalis.

The wingspan is 31 to 40 millimeters.

The host plants are in Brassicaceae (the mustard family) and include Caulanthus, Streptanthus, and Sisymbrium altissimum, Arabis glabra, Arabis furcata, and Arabis holboelli.

Subspecies
Listed alphabetically.
Pontia sisymbrii elivata (Barnes & Benjamin, 1926)
Pontia sisymbrii flavitincta (Comstock, 1924)
Pontia sisymbrii nigravenosa Austin & Emmel, ?2003
Pontia sisymbrii sisymbrii
Pontia sisymbrii transversa Holland, 1995

References

External links

 Butterflies and Moths of North-America: Pontia sisymbrii (Spring white)

sisymbrii
Butterflies of North America
Fauna of California
Fauna of the Sierra Nevada (United States)
Butterflies described in 1852